St. Mary of Bendones is an Asturian Pre-Romanesque Roman Catholic church situated in Bendones, Spain, build between 792 and 842.

It was designated a Spanish National Monument in 1958. It has an arcade with side chapels as well as a three-part head with a large transept.

Architecture 
The structure is similar to the church of San Julián de los Prados, although the ground plan is not the typical basilica of  the Pre-Romanesque churches, but has three enclosures at the western end, the central one as an entrance vestibule and two side areas possibly to house parishioners or ecclesiastics. This entrance leads into a single nave with a wooden ceiling, the same length as the entrance enclosures. The nave adjoins two rectangular side areas, also with a wooden ceiling, whose use seems to associated with the liturgical rites of the period. this nave joined with the sanctuary by three semicircular brick arches, each of which leads into its corresponding chapel, of which only the main or central one is covered with a brick barrel vault, the other two with wooden ceilings.

Above the main chapel is the "typical" chamber, only accessible from outside, through a trefoil window with the standard Pre-Romanesque features; central arch larger than the side  ones, resting on two free-standing capitals with rope moulding, and the upper rectangle framed by simple moulding.

Independent from the church structure, though close to its southern facade, stands the bell tower, on a rectangular ground plan.

See also 
Asturian architecture
Catholic Church in Spain

References

Sources 
 Luis Menéndez Pidal y Alvarez, Santa María de Bendones, Oviedo: Reconstrucción, Instituto de Estudios Asturianos, 1974 
 
 
 
 Prerrománico Asturiano. El arte de la monarquía Asturiana. Gijón, 1999. Editorial Trea 
 A la búsqueda del prerrománico olvidado (2 Tomos). Gijón, 1999. Author: Francisco Monge Calleja 
 Guía del prerómanico: Visigodo, Asturiano, Mozárabe. Madrid, 2005. Editorial: Anaya

External links 

 Iglesia de Santa María de Bendones, 3D model in  Google SketchUp

9th-century churches in Spain
Maria de Bendones
Pre-Romanesque architecture in Asturias
9th-century establishments in Spain
Bien de Interés Cultural landmarks in Asturias
Religious buildings and structures completed in 842